The 2016–17 season was Stevenage's third consecutive season in League Two and their 41st year in existence. Along with competing in League Two, the club also participated in the FA Cup, League Cup and Football League Trophy. The season covers the period from 1 July 2015 to 30 June 2016.

Transfers

Transfers in

Transfers out

Loans in

Loans out

Competitions

Pre-season friendlies

League Two

League table

Matches

FA Cup

EFL Cup

EFL Trophy

References

Stevenage
Stevenage F.C. seasons